Philosophical Investigations is a quarterly peer-reviewed academic journal which features articles, discussion, and literature reviews from every field of philosophy. Special issues are occasionally published on topics of current philosophical interest. It is the official journal of the British Wittgenstein Society, which aims to ensure that Ludwig Wittgenstein's philosophy continues to play a fertile and creative role in 21st century thought.

References

External links 
 
 British Wittgenstein Society

Philosophy journals
Publications established in 1978
Wiley-Blackwell academic journals
Quarterly journals
English-language journals